Vladimir Naumovich Naumov (6 December 1927 – 29 November 2021) was a Russian film director and writer. Naumov was named People’s Artist of the USSR in 1983. He was a schoolmate of Sergei Parajanov at the Soviet film school. In 1977 he was a member of the jury at the 10th Moscow International Film Festival. His 1981 film Teheran 43 won the Golden Prize at the 12th Moscow International Film Festival.

Life and career
Naumov, son of cinematographer Naum Naumov-Strazh, studied with Igor Savchenko at the VGIK in 1947–1951 and worked as one of his assistants on the biopic Taras Shevchenko (1951), which he completed with fellow student Aleksandr Alov after Savchenko’s sudden passing. Following the success of that debut, Alov and Naumov began to make films at the Kiev film studio as a team under the label “Alov and Naumov”.

After 1983 when Alov passed away, Naumov directed several pictures on his own. His first independent picture was The Choice (1987). In 1989, Naumov completed The Law based on a script that had been prohibited more than 20 years earlier. That film and Ten Years without Permission to Correspond (1990) deal with the country's Stalinist past. The script for the 1994 drama White Feast, starring Innokenty Smoktunovsky in his last role, was a collaboration between Naumov and prominent Italian screenwriter Tonino Guerra. Another project with Guerra, Nardo's Secret(1997/99), was troubled by never-ending financial difficulties and passed several stages before finally being released in 2001 as Clock without Hands. Like Naumov’s other films of the 1990s, it suffered severely from Russia's cinema industry crisis and was seen by few people.

Naumov has been teaching at VGIK since 1980 and in 1986 he was promoted to the rank of full professor. In 2000, he began to teach at the private Natalya Nesterova University in Moscow.

Vladimir Naumov died on 29 November 2021, at the age of 93.

Filmography 
Note: all films before 1987 are co-directed with Aleksandr Alov
 Taras Shevchenko (1951)
 Restless Youth (1954)
 Pavel Korchagin (Павел Корчагин) (1957)
 The Wind (1959)
 Peace to Him Who Enters (1961)
 The Coin (1965)
 The Ugly Story (1966)
 The Flight (1970)
 Legend About Thiel (1976)
 Teheran 43 (1981)
 The Shore (1984)
 The Choice (1987)
 The Law (1989)
 Ten Years Without Right to Write Letters (1990)
 White Feast (1994)
 Nardo's Secret (1999)
 Clock without Hands (2001)
 La Gioconda on Asphalt (2007)

References

External links

1927 births
2021 deaths
Soviet film directors
Russian film directors
Academic staff of the Gerasimov Institute of Cinematography
Honorary Members of the Russian Academy of Arts
Academicians of the National Academy of Motion Picture Arts and Sciences of Russia
Mass media people from Saint Petersburg
Recipients of the Order "For Merit to the Fatherland", 2nd class
Soviet screenwriters
20th-century Russian screenwriters
Male screenwriters
20th-century Russian male writers
Recipients of the Order of Honour (Russia)
Recipients of the Order of Friendship of Peoples
People's Artists of the USSR
People's Artists of the RSFSR
Recipients of the USSR State Prize
Gerasimov Institute of Cinematography alumni